Brighton Labeau (born 1 January 1996) is a footballer who plays as a forward for Swiss club Lausanne-Sport. Born in mainland France, he plays for the Martinique national team.

Professional career
Labeau made his professional debut for Amiens in a 2–0 Ligue 1 loss to Paris Saint-Germain on 5 August 2017.

On 3 August 2021, he signed with Lausanne-Ouchy in Switzerland.

On 28 June 2022, Labeau moved to Lausanne-Sport.

International career
Born in mainland France, Labeau is of Martiniquais descent. He was called up to represent the Martinique national team for a pair of friendlies in March 2022. He debuted with Martinique in a friendly 4–3 win over Guadeloupe on 26 March 2022.

References

External links
LFP Profile

1996 births
Sportspeople from Aubervilliers
Living people
Martiniquais footballers
Martinique international footballers
French footballers
French people of Martiniquais descent
Association football forwards
AS Monaco FC players
Amiens SC players
US Créteil-Lusitanos players
FC Villefranche Beaujolais players
FC Rapid București players
Royale Union Saint-Gilloise players
FC Stade Lausanne Ouchy players
FC Lausanne-Sport players
Ligue 1 players
Championnat National players
Championnat National 2 players
Championnat National 3 players
Liga II players
Challenger Pro League players
Swiss Challenge League players
French expatriate footballers
Expatriate footballers in Romania
French expatriate sportspeople in Romania
Expatriate footballers in Belgium
French expatriate sportspeople in Belgium
Expatriate footballers in Switzerland
French expatriate sportspeople in Switzerland
Footballers from Seine-Saint-Denis